The Arizona Peace Officers Standards and Training board is the agency responsible for the training of Arizona law enforcement.

Overview
The board was formed on July 1, 1968, as the Arizona Law Enforcement Officer Advisory Council, with a change of name on July 17, 1994.

See also
Florida Criminal Justice Standards & Training Commission

References

External links
 Official website

Law enforcement in Arizona
1968 establishments in Arizona